Events from the year 1629 in art.

Events
 Pope Urban VIII asks Bernini to sketch possible renovations to the Trevi Fountain

Paintings

Marcus Gheeraerts the Younger - Anne Hale, Mrs Hoskins
Dirck Hals - Merry Company at Table (1627–29)
Judith Leyster - Serenade
Daniël Mijtens - James Hamilton, Marquess of Hamilton (adult portrait)
Jan Porcellis - Vessels in a Moderate Breeze
Nicolas Poussin - The Martyrdom of Saint Erasmus
Rembrandt
Judas Repentant, Returning the Pieces of Silver
Self-portrait
Guido Reni - Annunciation
Sir Anthony Van Dyck - Rinaldo and Armida
Velázquez - Los Borrachos
Francisco de Zurbarán - Vision of Saint Peter Nolasco

Births
January - Gabriël Metsu, Dutch painter (died 1667)
September 4 - Lorenzo Pasinelli, Italian painter in a Mannerism style of genre-like allegories (died 1700)
December - Pieter de Hooch, Dutch painter (died 1684)
date unknown
Antonio Vela Cobo, Spanish Baroque painter, sculptor and gilder (died 1675)
Pierre Le Gros the Elder, French sculptor for the Versailles (died 1714)
Giovanni Peruzzini, Italian painter of lunettes and religious themed works (died 1694)
Giovan Battista Ruoppolo, Neapolitan painter, notable for still-lifes (died 1693)

Deaths
March 29 - Jacob de Gheyn II, Dutch painter and engraver (born 1565)
May 6 - Otto van Veen, painter, draughtsman, and humanist (born 1556)
August 21 – Camillo Procaccini, Italian painter, in 1571 a student in the Bolognese painters' guild (born 1551)
August 29 - Pietro Bernini, Italian sculptor and father of the more famous Gianlorenzo Bernini (born 1562)
November - Filippo Napoletano, Italian artist of diverse paintings of exotic soldiers, skeletons of animals, or cityscapes (born 1587)
November 1 - Hendrick ter Brugghen, Dutch painter, and a leading member of the Dutch followers of Caravaggio (born 1588)
December 4 - Grazio Cossali, Italian painter (born 1563)
date unknown
Abdón Castañeda, Spanish Baroque painter (born 1580)
Bartolomeo Cesi, Italian painter of the Bolognese School (born 1556)
Carlo Maderno, Italian sculptor (born 1556)
Aegidius Sadeler II, Flemish engraver of the Sadeler family (born 1570)
Jacob van Doordt, Dutch portrait miniature painter (born unknown)
Antonio Vassilacchi, Greek painter active in Venice (born 1556)

References

 
Years of the 17th century in art
1620s in art